Rodrick Kenneth Barnes (born January 8, 1966) is an American college basketball coach.  He is the head men's basketball coach a California State University, Bakersfield, a position he has held since 2011.  Barnes held the same position at the University of Mississippi (Ole Miss) from 1998 to 2006 and Georgia State University from 2007 to 2011.

Playing and early coaching career
Barnes played college basketball at the University of Mississippi of the NCAA Division I's Southeastern Conference from 1985 to 1988. He earned All-SEC and All-America honorable mention honors in 1988. Barnes earned his business administration degree in 1989 and left Ole Miss to become an assistant coach at Livingston University in 1990. In 1993, Barnes returned to Ole Miss to serve as an assistant coach to Rob Evans. Barnes helped coach Ole Miss to consecutive 20-win seasons and NCAA Men's Division I Basketball Championship berths in 1997 and 1998.

Head coaching career
When Evans departed for Arizona State University in 1998, Barnes was promoted to head coach of Ole Miss. Barnes coached them for eight seasons, building a 141–109 record.  In his first year, Barnes tallied Ole Miss' first-ever NCAA Tournament win. The Rebels had been one of the few longstanding members of a "power conference" to have never won an NCAA Tournament game. He was named 2001 Naismith College Coach of the Year and the 2001 SEC Coach of the Year after leading Ole Miss to a school-record 27-win season in 2000–01 which included a trip to the Sweet Sixteen round of the NCAA Men's Division I Basketball Championship—the deepest NCAA tournament run in school history. 

However, Barnes would only garner one other winning season after the Sweet 16 appearance.  He was fired after the 2005–06 season in which Ole Miss started 13–3 but lost 13 of their last 14 games. Barnes served as an assistant coach at the Oklahoma during the 2006–07 season.

On March 19, 2007, Barnes was hired as the head coach of the men's basketball team at Georgia State University of the NCAA Division I's Colonial Athletic Association.  On February 26, 2011, it was announced that Barnes would not return as head coach at Georgia State.  On March 30, 2011 Rod Barnes was named head men's basketball coach at Cal State Bakersfield.

In his fifth season in Bakersfield, Barnes led the Roadrunners to the programs' first appearance in the NCAA Men's Division I Basketball Championship. CSUB earned its berth with a buzzer-beating victory over New Mexico State in the finals of the Western Athletic Conference Tournament. Barnes's squad fell to Oklahoma in the first round of the NCAA Tournament, but he earned a five-year contract extension at the end of the campaign.  He was also named a finalist for the Ben Jobe Award, given annually to the top minority coach in NCAA Division I Men's Basketball.

Head coaching record

References

External links
 Cal State Bakersfield profile
 Georgia State profile

1966 births
Living people
American men's basketball players
Basketball coaches from Mississippi
Basketball players from Mississippi
Cal State Bakersfield Roadrunners men's basketball coaches
College men's basketball head coaches in the United States
Georgia State Panthers men's basketball coaches
Oklahoma Sooners men's basketball coaches
Ole Miss Rebels men's basketball coaches
Ole Miss Rebels men's basketball players
People from Yazoo County, Mississippi
West Alabama Tigers men's basketball coaches